The Wife Swappers is a 1970 drama film by British sexploitation director Derek Ford. The film was produced by Stanley Long and stars James Donnelly, Larry Taylor and Valerie St. John.

The film was a huge commercial success relative to its budget.

The film was released on UK DVD in January 2007 on the Slam Dunk Media Label (the US DVD release on the Jeff films label is an unauthorized bootleg.)

Cast
James Donnelly - Paul 
Larry Taylor - Leonard 
Valerie St. John - Ellen 
Denys Hawthorne - Cliff 
Bunty Garland - Sheila 
Sandra Satchwith - Carol 
Fiona Fraser - Marion 
Joan Hayward - Jean

References

External links
 

1970 films
1970 comedy-drama films
British sexploitation films
British comedy-drama films
1970 comedy films
1970 drama films
Films directed by Derek Ford
1970s English-language films
1970s British films